The Kaohsiung Twin Towers, also known as Illuna Towers, is a complex of twin residential skyscrapers completed in 1996 and located in Qianjin District, Kaohsiung, Taiwan. As of December 2020, it is the 19th tallest building in Kaohsiung.

See also 
 List of tallest buildings in Taiwan
 List of tallest buildings in Kaohsiung
 Ba Ba - Central Park
 King's Town Hyatt

References

1996 establishments in Taiwan
Apartment buildings in Taiwan
Residential skyscrapers in Taiwan
Skyscrapers in Kaohsiung
Residential buildings completed in 1996
Twin towers